Eriophora is a genus of orb-weaver spiders first described by Eugène Simon in 1895. It occurs in the Americas, Australasia, and Africa. The name is derived from Ancient Greek roots, and means "wool bearing".

Species
Most species now grouped here have been classified as Araneus at some time in their description history.  Eriophora contains seven species:
Eriophora conica (Yin, Wang & Zhang, 1987) – China
Eriophora edax (Blackwall, 1863) – USA to Brazil
Eriophora fuliginea (C. L. Koch, 1838) – Honduras to Brazil
Eriophora nephiloides (O. Pickard-Cambridge, 1889) – Guatemala to Guyana
Eriophora neufvilleorum (Lessert, 1930) – Congo, Ethiopia
Eriophora pustulosa (Walckenaer, 1841) – Australia, Tasmania, New Zealand
Eriophora ravilla (C. L. Koch, 1844) – USA to Brazil

Gallery

References

External links

   Eriophora ravilla,  a tropical orb weaver spider on the UF / IFAS  Featured Creatures Web site

Araneidae
Araneomorphae genera
Cosmopolitan spiders
Taxa named by Eugène Simon